Dejan Mišković (born February 13, 1974) is a Serbian former professional basketball player.

Playing career 
Mišković played five seasons in total in the Yugoslav League, for Spartak Subotica, Crvena zvezda and Atlas. From 1998–2000, he played for AZS UMK Toruń and Stal Ostrów Wielkopolski of the Polish League. Also, he played for Lokomotiv Mineralnye Vody (Russian Super League 1), Apollon Limassol (Cyprus Division A), Amsterdam Astronauts (Dutch League) and Doukas (Greek A2 League). He finished his professional career in Iranian Super League where he played for the Trust Pasargad from Shiraz during the 2009–10 season.

International career 
Mišković was a member of the FR Yugoslavia national under-22 team that won the bronze medal at the 1996 European Championship for 22 and Under in Turkey. Over seven tournament games, he averaged 9.3 points, 4.7 rebounds and 0.3 assists per game. Also, he represented SFR Yugoslavia national under-16 team at the 1991 European Championship for Cadets together with Predrag Drobnjak, Saša Dončić, Haris Brkić and Zlatko Bolić among others. Over seven tournament games, he averaged 9.3 points per game.

Career achievements and awards

Club 
 Yugoslav League champion: 1 (with Crvena zvezda: 1997–98)
 Dutch League champion: 1 (with Amsterdam Astronauts: 2004–05)
 FIBA Korać Cup runner-up: (with Crvena zvezda: 1997–98)

National team
 1996 European Championship for 22 and Under:

Individual 
 Polish League All-Star Game: 1999

Personal life 
His sons Nikola (born 1999) and Novak (born 2001) are professional basketball players. Nikola is currently playing for the Mega Bemax and he was the 2017 FIBA Europe Under-18 Championship MVP. Novak is playing for the Mega Bemax junior team.

References

1974 births
Living people
Amsterdam Basketball players
Apollon Limassol BC players
German expatriate basketball people in Serbia
KK Crvena zvezda players
KK Spartak Subotica players
Stal Ostrów Wielkopolski players
Serbian men's basketball players
Serbian expatriate basketball people in Cyprus
Serbian expatriate basketball people in Greece
Serbian expatriate basketball people in Iran
Serbian expatriate basketball people in Poland
Serbian expatriate basketball people in Russia
Serbian expatriate basketball people in the Netherlands
PBC Lokomotiv-Kuban players
Sportspeople from Ingolstadt
Centers (basketball)